Hallgarth is a small village in County Durham, England, to the east of Durham. It is in the parish of Pittington and is described there.

References

Villages in County Durham
Pittington